Murphy-Lamb House and Cemetery is a historic plantation house located near Garland, Sampson County, North Carolina.   The house was built about 1835, and is a two-story, five bay by two bay, single pile Federal style frame dwelling. It has a brick pier foundation, side gable roof, and engaged front porch with a shed roof and engaged rear shed. The interior follows a hall-and-parlor plan. Also on the property is the contributing family cemetery.  It is identical in form to the Samuel Johnson House.

It was added to the National Register of Historic Places in 1986.

References

Plantation houses in North Carolina
Houses on the National Register of Historic Places in North Carolina
Federal architecture in North Carolina
Houses completed in 1835
Houses in Sampson County, North Carolina
National Register of Historic Places in Sampson County, North Carolina